Charab (also Romanized as Charāb) is a village in Eram Rural District, Eram District, Dashtestan County, Bushehr Province, Iran. At the 2006 census, its population was 87, in 16 families.

References 

Populated places in Dashtestan County